The following article is a summary of the 2021 Indonesia national football team international results of each categories.

Men's national football team

Record

Friendlies

2022 FIFA World Cup qualification

2023 AFC Asian Cup qualification – Play-off Round

2020 AFF Championship

Men's under-23 football team

Record

Friendlies

2022 AFC U-23 Asian Cup qualification

Women's national football team

Record

2022 AFC Women's Asian Cup qualification

References 

2021 national football team results
Indonesia national football team results